EWOS or EWOS Group,  was then one of the world's largest suppliers of feed and nutrition for farmed fish. Former EWOS companies operate in Canada, Chile, Norway, Scotland and Vietnam as part of Cargill Animal Nutrition, CAN.

The company, which was created in 1931, was bought by Cargill in 2015. It started in Södertälje, Sweden, in THE premises of Astra (now Astra Seneca). Beside animal Good it Aldo produced agrochemical products and Helosan creme

History
EWOS was established in 1931 by Erik Berggren, Victor Weyde and Olle Sjöstedt, names from which the acronym derives. In the beginning the production volumes were low, but from 1980 and onwards, the average annual growth rate has been 18%. Today, EWOS provides feed and nutrition for 28 different fish species with salmon as the major species

Enterprise
At the time of Cargill's acquisition, EWOS Group consisted of subsidiary companies in five countries, as well as an R&D company. The five were:
EWOS AS – Located in Norway. EWOS’ head office is located in Bergen.
EWOS Ltd. – Located in Westfield, near Edinburgh, Scotland
EWOS Canada Ltd. – Located near Vancouver, British Columbia, Canada
EWOS Chile SA – Located in Chile
EWOS Innovation – EWOS’ research and development Company located in Chile and Norway

In 2010 EWOS entered the market in Vietnam, selling feed for the white fish pangasius and other species such as snakehead.

Notes

External links 
Homepage (English)

Companies based in Hordaland
Business services companies established in 1931
1931 establishments in Norway
Manufacturing companies established in 1931